Norberto Joya "Bert" Marcelo Sr. (June 6, 1936 – December 16, 1995) was a prominent Filipino television personality whose trademark high-pitched infectious laughter earned him the popular moniker "Tawa", after the Tagalog word for laugh.

Background
Born in Baliuag, Bulacan, Marcelo's persona as the Filipino everyman, enhanced by his fluency in the Tagalog language and his easy-going friendly nature, made him ideal as the most recognized endorser of the popular San Miguel Beer. Apart from his classic commercials for San Miguel Beer such as Isang Platitong Mani, Marcelo was also best known as the co-host with Pilita Corrales in Ang Bagong Kampeon, a long-running television talent show which discovered Regine Velasquez among other talents. He was also an occasional actor in films, as well in television sitcoms such as Baltic and Company in 1974.

Personal life
He was married to Alicia Trinidad Castro; they had four sons.

Death
Marcelo died at the peak of his career when he suffered a fatal stroke on December 16, 1995.
He was buried at Municipal Cemetery in Baliuag, Bulacan

Filmography

Film
Everlasting Love (1989)
Isang Platitong Mani (1986)
Mga Mata ni Angelita (1978)
Kapten Batuten en his Super Batuta (1977)
Tisoy! (1977)
Wanakosay (1977)
Oh Margie Oh (1974)
The Panther (1973)
Ang Pangalan Ko'y Luray (1971)
Padre, si Eba (1971)
D' Musical Teenage Idols! (1969)
Tisoy (1969)
Brownout (1969)
Teenage Escapades! (1969)
Tore ng Diyablo (1969)
Pomposa: Ang Kabayong Tsismosa (1968)

Television
 Agrisiyete (GMA Network, 1991–1995) - his last TV appearance 
 Tanghalan ng Kampeon (GMA Network, 1987–1993)
 Ang Bagong Kampeon (RPN 9, 1985–1988)
 Kalatog Pinggan (BBC 2/ABS-CBN, 1985–1986/1987–1988)
 Prinsipe Abante (GMA Network, 1977–1979)
 Baltic and Company (GMA Network, 1974–1976)

References

External links
 

1936 births
1995 deaths
Filipino male comedians
Filipino television personalities
Male actors from Bulacan
20th-century Filipino male actors
20th-century comedians
Filipino actor-politicians
Filipino male film actors
Filipino male television actors
GMA Network personalities